Trygve Retvik (born 15 July 1944 in Lier, Norway) is a Norwegian artist specialised in drawing, painting and printmaking. Retvik is trained and educated both as a teacher and in the fine arts, and has mainly been teaching at the Faculty of Art, Design and Drama at the Oslo University College as associate professor in the fields of drawing, graphics and fine arts didactics. Retvik has studied at the Norwegian National Academy of Craft and Art Industry, the Norwegian National Academy of Fine Arts and the Academy of Fine Arts in Rome, Italy (Accademia di belle arti di Roma).

Exhibitions
Since his debut in 1974 Retvik has had a long string of exhibitions, showing drawings, paintings and prints.

Individual exhibitions – a selection
Unge Kunstneres Samfunn, Oslo, Norway, debut 1974
Groruddalen Kunstforening, Oslo, Norway 1979
Holmestrand Kunstforening, Holmestrand, Norway 1985
Ullensaker Kunstforening, Ullensaker, Norway 1986
Blå Galleri, Oslo, Norway 1988
Galleri Profil, Bergen, Norway 1991
Galleri PP 33, Oslo, Norway 2007
Galleri PP 33, Oslo, Norway 2009
Galleri PP 33, Oslo, Norway 2010

Group- and collective exhibitions - a selection
Moss Kunstgalleri, Moss, Norway 1975
Unge Kunstneres Samfunn, Erotisk kunst, Oslo, Norway 1976
Galleri 27, Oslo, Norway 1977
Galleri F 15, Ung 85, nordisk temautstilling, Moss, Norway 1985
Norske Grafikere i Litauen, Lithuania 1988
Ås Kunstforening, Jubileumsutstilling, Ås, Norway 1990
Galleri Aske, Oslo, Norway 1993
Premio Mestre, Venezia, Italy 2009
Høstutstillingen, Oslo, Norway
Østlandsutstillingen, Oslo, Norway
Unge Kunstneres Samfunns Vårutstilling, Oslo, Norway

Works
Tegning som uttrykk (1998)

References

External links

Trygve Retvik's web page Oslo University College

1944 births
Living people
20th-century Norwegian painters
21st-century Norwegian painters
People from Lier, Norway